Viktor Yosypovych Razvadovsky (born 3 June 1959) is a Ukrainian politician and police officer who served as a People's Deputy of Ukraine from 29 March 1998 to 26 March 2006 and then again from 12 December 2012 to 29 August 2019. General-colonel of police, Doctor of Law Science, professor, honoured lawyer of Ukraine.

Education

Taras Shevchenko National University of Kyiv (1983—1989), a lawyer; postgraduate department there (1989—1992) PhD thesis «Administrative responsibility for breaker of norms, rules and standards providing traffic safety»
 National University “Odessa Academy of Law ”, (1998) Doctor of Science thesis «State regulation of Ukrainian transport system (administrative-law problems and the ways of their solving)»
 National Academy of Internal Affairs of Ukraine, 2004).

Working activity

 November 1977 — September 1987 — service in the army
 September 1987 — June 1988 — state traffic control police inspector
 June 1988 — February 1989 — inspector
 February — July 1989 — chief inspector
 July, 1989 — July 1991 — a deputy chief
 July, 1991— July 1992 — a chief of Road Patrol Service Department
 July, 1992 — March 1995 — a deputy chief of Administration of State Traffic Police of Ukraine in Kyiv
 March — July 1995 — a deputy chief of administration of public order maintenance  of the Head Office of the Ministry of Internal Affairs of Ukraine in Kyiv.
 July 1995 — December 1996 — a deputy chief of administration of State Traffic Police of the Head Office of the Ministry of Internal Affairs of Ukraine in Kyiv.
 December 1996 — March 1998 — a deputy chief,
 March — May 1998 — the first a deputy chief of the Main Tax Militia Administration of the State Tax Administration of Ukraine.
 August — September 2006 — a deputy chief of Information Defense Department,
 September — October 2006 — a deputy chief of Law Department of the State Tax Administration of Ukraine.
 October 2006 — April 2007 — Ukraine's МВД Minister's consultant on cooperation with the Bodies of State Power.
 April 2007 — June 2008 — consultant of the Chairman of State Tax Administration of Ukraine.
 July 2008 — September 2009 — the chief of the Ministry of Internal Affairs of Ukraine in Kharkiv Oblast.
 Since September 2009 — the chief of Transit Polite Department of the Ministry of Internal Affairs of Ukraine.

Participant
 Combat veteran in Afghanistan.
 Post-accident clean-up participant in Chernobyl Nuclear Power Plant.

Public-political activity

 People's Deputy of Ukraine of the IIIrd convocation since March 1998 to April 2002, election district No. 69, Zhytomyr Oblast. During elections: a chief deputy of the Main Tax Militia Administration of the State Tax Administration of Ukraine, non-party. A chief deputy of the committee on legal support and control over the activity of special bodies in the sphere of corruption prevention and counteraction (July 1998 — February 2000), a deputy chief of the Committee on Corruption Prevention and Counteraction (since February 2000).
 People's Deputy of Ukraine of the IVth convocation since April 2002 to April 2006, election district No. 69, Zhytomyr Oblast, self-nomination. A chairman of subcommittee on legal support and control over the activity of special bodies in the sphere of corruption prevention and counteraction on the control on secret expenses and cooperation with Audit Chamber of the committee on corruption prevention and counteraction (since June, 2002).
 People's deputy of Ukraine of the VIIth convocation since  December 2012, election district No. 67, Zhytomyr Oblast, self-nomination. During the elections: a chief of Department of transit police МВД of Ukraine, non-party.
 People's deputy of Ukraine of the VIII convocation. Since October 2014, a deputy in election district No. 67, Zhytomyr Oblast, a self-nominated candidate. Having been elected the deputy, participated a deputy group «People’s Will».

Honours

 Honoured Lawyer of Ukraine (July 1997).
 General-colonel.
 20 state awards, including Certificate of the Presidium of the Supreme Soviet of the USSR . Certificate of Honour of Cabinet of Ministers of Ukraine. Certificate of Honour of the Verkhovna Rada of Ukraine. Order «For Courage» III stage. Danylo Galitsky Order.
 6 awards of the Ukrainian Orthodox Church of Moscow Patriarchy.

Family

 Daughter Margaryta (1981)
 Grandsons Arthur, Victor

References

External links

 Verkhovna Rada of Ukraine, official web portal

1959 births
Living people
People from Zhytomyr Oblast
20th-century Ukrainian lawyers
21st-century Ukrainian lawyers
University of Kyiv, Law faculty alumni
Third convocation members of the Verkhovna Rada
Fourth convocation members of the Verkhovna Rada
Seventh convocation members of the Verkhovna Rada
Eighth convocation members of the Verkhovna Rada
Soviet military personnel of the Soviet–Afghan War
Chernobyl liquidators
Colonel Generals of Ukraine
Recipients of the Order For Courage, 3rd class
Laureates of the Honorary Diploma of the Verkhovna Rada of Ukraine